Downhill railway station served the hamlet of Downhill in County Londonderry in Northern Ireland.

The Londonderry and Coleraine Railway opened the station on 18 July 1853. A station building and adjacent station house was erected in 1874 to designs by the architect John Lanyon.

It closed on 3 September 1973.

Routes

References

Disused railway stations in County Londonderry
Railway stations opened in 1853
Railway stations closed in 1973

Railway stations in Northern Ireland opened in 1853